The recoil temperature is a fundamental lower limit of temperature attainable by some laser cooling schemes, and corresponds to the recoil energy deposited in a single atom initially at rest by the spontaneous emission of a single photon. The recoil temperature is

,

In general, the recoil temperature is below the  Doppler cooling limit for atoms and molecules, so sub-Doppler cooling techniques such as Sisyphus cooling are necessary to reach it. For example, the recoil temperature for the D2 lines of alkali atoms is typically on the order of 1 μK, in contrast with a Doppler cooling limit on the order of 100 μK. 

Cooling beyond the recoil limit is possible using specific schemes such as Raman cooling. Sub-recoil temperatures can also occur in the Lamb Dicke regime, where an atom is so strongly confined that its motion (and thus temperature) is effectively unchanged by recoil photons.

References 

Atomic physics